Saale-Orla-Kreis II is an electoral constituency (German: Wahlkreis) represented in the Landtag of Thuringia. It elects one member via first-past-the-post voting. Under the current constituency numbering system, it is designated as constituency 34. It covers the northern part of Saale-Orla-Kreis.

Saale-Orla-Kreis II was created for the 1994 state election. Since 2014, it has been represented by Christian Herrgott of the Christian Democratic Union (CDU).

Geography
As of the 2019 state election, Saale-Orla-Kreis II covers the northern part of Saale-Orla-Kreis, specifically the municipalities of Bodelwitz, Döbritz, Dreitzsch, Eßbach, Geroda, Gertewitz, Gössitz, Grobengereuth, Keila, Kospoda, Krölpa, Langenorla, Lausnitz b. Neustadt an der Orla, Lemnitz, Linda b. Neustadt an der Orla, Miesitz, Mittelpöllnitz, Moxa, Neustadt an der Orla, Nimritz, Oberoppurg, Oppurg, Paska, Peuschen, Pößneck, Quaschwitz, Ranis, Rosendorf, Schleiz (only Crispendorf), Schmieritz, Schmorda, Schöndorf, Seisla, Solkwitz, Tömmelsdorf, Triptis, Weira, Wernburg, Wilhelmsdorf, and Ziegenrück.

Members
The constituency was held by the Christian Democratic Union from its creation in 1994 until 2009, during which time it was represented by Gottfried Schugens. It was won by The Left in 2009, and was represented by Heidrun Sedlacik. The CDU's candidate Christian Herrgott regained the constituency in 2014, and was re-elected in 2019.

Election results

2019 election

2014 election

2009 election

2004 election

1999 election

1994 election

References

Electoral districts in Thuringia
1994 establishments in Germany
Saale-Orla-Kreis
Constituencies established in 1994